Gustavo Affonso Sauerbeck (born 30 April 1993), also known as Gustavo Sauer, is a Brazilian footballer who plays as a forward for Campeonato Brasileiro Série A club Botafogo.

Club career

Early career
In February 2016, Gustavo was loaned to K League Challenge side Daejeon Citizen for the 2016 season. Previously, Gustavo had been on loan at fellow Brazilian sides Metropolitano and Paraná in 2015, and Armenian side Gandzasar Kapan in the latter half of 2014.

Botev Plovdiv
On 25 August 2017, Gustavo joined Botev Plovdiv. Gustavo made a debut on 21 September during the 1-3 away victory in the 1/16 final of the Bulgarian Cup against Lokomotiv Gorna Oryahovitsa.

On 24 September Gustavo played his first game in First Professional Football League (Bulgaria) and scored a goal for the 3-0 win in the derby game against Lokomotiv Plovdiv.

On 11 May 2018 Gustavo had a controversial performance during the 2-1 win over Beroe Stara Zagora. He assisted for the first goal of João Paulo da Silva Araújo but later on was sent off for committing a brutal foul against Matheus Leoni.

After a long goal-drought, on 25 August 2018, Gustavo scored in the last minute for the 0-2 away win over FC Vitosha Bistritsa.

Personal life
His younger brother Gabriel Sauer is also a footballer. A centre-back, he was also groomed at Joinville.

Career statistics

Honors
Joinville
Copa Santa Catarina: 2013
Campeonato Brasileiro Série B: 2014

References

External links

1993 births
Living people
Brazilian footballers
Joinville Esporte Clube players
Paraná Clube players
Botafogo de Futebol e Regatas players
Daejeon Hana Citizen FC players
FC Gandzasar Kapan players
Botev Plovdiv players
Boavista F.C. players
Campeonato Brasileiro Série A players
Campeonato Brasileiro Série B players
Armenian Premier League players
First Professional Football League (Bulgaria) players
Primeira Liga players
Brazilian expatriate footballers
Expatriate footballers in South Korea
Expatriate footballers in Armenia
Expatriate footballers in the United Arab Emirates
Expatriate footballers in Bulgaria
Expatriate footballers in Portugal
Association football forwards